Droitwich Austin Friars was located in the area now known as the Vines. It was established in 1331, when a plot of 300 square feet was given to build an oratory and habitation.

Dissolution
The most information available about the establishment comes from the period of the dissolution. James Gairdner gives an account of the Bishop of Dover's examination of various friaries including Droitwich. Its property was disposed of by 1543.

References

Sources

 
 

Worcestershire
History of Worcestershire
Anglican Diocese of Worcester
Monasteries in Worcestershire